The eighth season of Seinfeld, an American comedy television series began airing on September 19, 1996, and concluded on May 15, 1997, on NBC. 

The eighth season marked a turning point in the series. It is the first season where Seinfeld himself took creative control of the show after co-creator Larry David left. It is also the first season where the episodes no longer start with Jerry's stand-up routines. Seinfeld states that this is because he was too busy writing episodes to create additional stand-up material. As a result, the show began to remove itself from the 'show about nothing' format it had begun life as, and took a far more absurdist, surreal stylistic turn.

Production
Seinfeld was produced by Castle Rock Entertainment and distributed by Columbia Pictures Television and Columbia TriStar Television (now Sony Pictures Television) and aired on NBC in the US. The executive producers were Jerry Seinfeld, George Shapiro, and Howard West with Tom Gammill and Max Pross as supervising producers. Bruce Kirschbaum was the executive consultant. This season was directed by Andy Ackerman.

The series was set predominantly in an apartment block on New York City's Upper West Side; however, the eighth season was shot and mostly filmed in CBS Studio Center in Studio City, California. The show features Jerry Seinfeld as himself, and a host of Jerry's friends and acquaintances, which include George Costanza, Elaine Benes, and Cosmo Kramer, portrayed by Jason Alexander, Julia Louis-Dreyfus and Michael Richards, respectively.

Due to Julia Louis-Dreyfus's off-screen pregnancy, her character had to spend the latter half of this season hiding her belly behind furniture and laundry baskets.

Episodes

Reception 
The review aggregator website Rotten Tomatoes reported an 86% approval rating with an average rating of 9/10, based on 7 critic reviews.

References

External links

 
 
 

8
1996 American television seasons
1997 American television seasons